The 1996 Asian Wrestling Championships were held in Xiaoshan, China. The event took place from April 4 to April 10, 1996. It acted as the Asian qualifying tournament for the 1996 Summer Olympics wrestling tournament.

The first women's tournament was an open competition, an American wrestler Tricia Saunders was the only non-Asian wrestler in competition and won the gold.

Medal table

Team ranking

Medal summary

Men's freestyle

Men's Greco-Roman

Women's freestyle

References
UWW Database

Asia
W
Asian Wrestling Championships
W